I'm entitled to my opinion (or I have a right to my opinion) is an informal fallacy in which someone dismisses arguments against their position by claiming that they have a right to hold their own particular viewpoint. The statement exemplifies a red herring or thought-terminating cliché. The fallacy is sometimes presented as "let's agree to disagree". Whether one has a particular entitlement or right is irrelevant to whether one's assertion is true or false. Where an objection to a belief is made, the assertion of the right to an opinion side-steps the usual steps of discourse of either asserting a justification of that belief, or an argument against the validity of the objection. Such an assertion, however, can also be an assertion of one's own freedom from, or a refusal to participate in, the rules of argumentation and logic at hand.

Philosopher Patrick Stokes has described the expression as problematic because it is often used to defend factually indefensible positions or to imply "an equal right to be heard on a matter in which only one of the two parties has the relevant expertise".

Philosopher José Ortega y Gasset wrote in his 1930 book The Revolt of the Masses:

See also 

 Aumann's agreement theorem
 
 
 
 
 
 
 Relativist fallacy

References 

Informal fallacies
English phrases